Christian Ramsebner, (born 26 March 1989) is an Austrian footballer who plays for SKN St. Pölten as a defender.

Club career
On 25 June 2021, he signed a two-year contract with SKN St. Pölten.

References

External links
 Guardian Football

1989 births
Living people
Austrian footballers
Austria under-21 international footballers
Association football defenders
SC Wiener Neustadt players
FK Austria Wien players
LASK players
SKN St. Pölten players
Austrian Football Bundesliga players
2. Liga (Austria) players
People from Kirchdorf an der Krems
Footballers from Upper Austria